Forever Love: 36 Greatest Hits (1980–2001) is a double-disc compilation album by Australian soft rock band Air Supply, released in 2003. It is the most complete collection of the band's work, including most of the band's singles up to 2001, as well as more obscure tracks such as "Strong Strong Wind" and "The Way I Feel". The compilation also includes songs from Russell Hitchcock's solo album and the live album Greatest Hits Live ... Now and Forever.

Reception 

James Monger of AllMusic felt that "Australian soft rock stewards Air Supply have had more than their share of compilations, but this sprawling 36-track collection from BMG is the first and last word on the amorous duo. Listeners who just want the hits -- whether "Making Love Out of Nothing at All," "All Out of Love," "Lost in Love," "Young Love," or any of their other hits with the word "love" in them—would be better off picking up Arista's 18-song Definitive Collection, but true Supply fans will need the exhaustive Forever Love: Greatest Hits, if only to have "Here I Am (Just When I Thought I Was Over You)," "I'll Never Get Enough of You," "Someone Who Believes in You," "Without You," and every other song with the word "you" in it."

Track listing

Disc 1

Disc 2

Credits 
 Liner notes – Graham Russell, Russell Hitchcock
 Photography by Lady Jodi Russell

References

External links

2003 greatest hits albums
Air Supply compilation albums